Shannon Ben Tubb (born 11 May 1980) is a former Australian cricket player, who played for Tasmania and South Australia. He played as a right-handed batsman and slow left-arm wrist-spin bowler who first represented Tasmania in 1999.

External links

1980 births
Living people
Australian cricketers
Tasmania cricketers
South Australia cricketers